Inga micheliana, known as the cuajiniquil, guaba de montaña, guajinicuil, or jacanaquil, is a species of plant in the family Fabaceae. It is found in Costa Rica, Guatemala, Honduras, Mexico, Nicaragua, and Panama.

References

micheliana
Flora of Central America
Flora of Mexico
Least concern plants
Taxonomy articles created by Polbot